The 2020–21 Premier League was the 29th season of the Premier League, the top English professional league for association football clubs since its establishment in 1992 and the 122nd season of top-flight English football overall. The season was initially scheduled to start on 8 August 2020 and end on 16 May 2021, but this was delayed until 12 September as a consequence of the postponement of the previous season's conclusion due to the COVID-19 pandemic. Liverpool were the defending champions, having won their first Premier League and nineteenth English league title the previous season. 

In a season largely played behind closed doors, Manchester City secured a fifth Premier League title and seventh English league title overall with three matches to spare; it was also the club's third title in the last four seasons.

Summary

Impact of COVID-19 pandemic 
At the start of this season, as was the case at the end of the previous season, there was limited or no attendance at matches besides each team's staff and personnel. On 23 November 2020, it was announced that some fans would be allowed to return to stadiums in low-risk areas at the end of the second national lockdown on 2 December 2020. The announcement of a third national lockdown on 4 January 2021, though, signalled a return to matches being played behind closed doors. 

On 22 February 2021, Prime Minister Boris Johnson announced as the third step of recovery from the lockdown imposed on 4 January, that subject to certain criteria being met on vaccines, infection rates and new coronavirus variants, large football stadiums would be allowed to reopen on 17 May with a maximum of 10,000 spectators or 25% capacity, whichever was higher. This meant that the final round of fixtures scheduled for the 23 May would see spectators return to the stadium. To ensure all clubs played their final home game in front of fans, the penultimate round of fixtures were rearranged to take place on 18–19 May. No away fans were permitted for these matches.

Season summary 
The 2020–21 season began on Saturday 12 September, just seven weeks after the conclusion of the 2019–20 season. Liverpool were the defending champions, having won their nineteenth league title the previous season, their first in the Premier League era. As originally planned, the 2020–21 season was to be the second Premier League season with a mid-season break in February, whereby five games of a normal round of ten would be played on one weekend and the remaining five the following weekend. However, due to the late start of the league and fixture congestion, the winter break was scrapped. It is also the second Premier League season to use VAR (Video Assistant Referee).

The race for first place 
The top of the table was tight for the first months of the season, with Arsenal, Leicester City, Everton, Liverpool, Southampton and Tottenham Hotspur all having occupied first position by late November. The top six were separated by only five points at that stage. Liverpool overtook Tottenham again in mid-December, following a meeting between the two clubs at Anfield which resulted in a  win to Liverpool.

Liverpool title defence collapses 
In the new year, Liverpool suffered from a significant slump in form. They suffered their first home defeat in 69 games with a  defeat to Burnley, which began a run of six consecutive losses at Anfield, following losses to Brighton & Hove Albion, Manchester City, Everton, Chelsea and Fulham, dropping to eighth place by early March.

Manchester City become the champions 
This was to prove the final change of team at the top, as Manchester City went on a 15-match winning streak which saw them 15 points clear of second-place Manchester United after a  win against Wolverhampton Wanderers on 2 March. They went on to secure the title on 12 May 2021 with three matches to spare, following a home defeat for Manchester United against Leicester. It was the club's fifth Premier League title and seventh English league title overall, as well as their third title in the past four seasons.

UEFA Champions League qualification 
The remaining two slots for Champions League qualification were taken by Liverpool and Chelsea. Although Liverpool were 8th with ten games remaining, a run of eight wins from their final ten games, including a 95th-minute winner scored by goalkeeper Alisson against West Bromwich Albion, saw them recover their position to finish 3rd and qualify for a fifth straight season. Chelsea endured a difficult start to the season under Frank Lampard, who was sacked in January with the club in 9th position and replaced by Thomas Tuchel. The club's form improved under Tuchel to secure a second consecutive finish in 4th place, despite a final day defeat to Aston Villa. They won in that season's Champions League final the next week, in the competition's third all-English final against champions Manchester City.

UEFA Europa League qualification 
Leicester enjoyed a successful season, spending more time in the top four places than any other club; however, three defeats in their final four games, including a home defeat to Tottenham Hotspur on the final day, saw them narrowly finish in 5th for a second consecutive season. Having narrowly avoiding relegation the previous season, West Ham United surprised many by finishing 6th, their highest finish since 1998–99. Both these clubs earned qualification to the Europa League for the following season.

Despite leading the table in November, Tottenham suffered a string of poor results from December onwards. Manager Jose Mourinho was sacked in April with the club in 7th place, with Ryan Mason taking over as interim manager for the rest of the season. Mason was unable to improve the club's position and they finished 7th, their lowest finish since the 2008–09 season, but still good enough to qualify for the brand new third tier Europa Conference League competition. Meanwhile, their traditional North London rivals Arsenal endured an even worse campaign; eight defeats in their first 14 games left them in 15th just before Christmas and seemingly in danger of being sucked into a relegation battle. Whilst they would pick up enough points thereafter to pull away from the bottom half of the table, the Gunners could only finish 8th for a second successive season; they failed to qualify for European competition for the first time since the 1994–95 season.

Relegation 
On 17 April 2021, Sheffield United were confirmed to be the first team to be relegated to the Championship following a  defeat away to Wolverhampton Wanderers with six games remaining, ending their two-year top flight tenure.  On 9 May 2021, West Bromwich Albion became the second team to be relegated following a  defeat away to Arsenal, with three games remaining, immediately returning to the Championship after a season's presence in the top flight. On 10 May 2021, Fulham were the third and final team to be relegated following a 2–0 defeat at home against Burnley with three games remaining, also immediately returning to the Championship after a season's presence in the top flight. This also marked the first time in the Premier League era that all three teams have been relegated with more than two games to spare. In contrast, the final promoted team, Leeds United, finished in 9th with 59 points, the highest points tally for a newly promoted side since Ipswich Town in 2000–01 (66 points).

Teams 
Twenty teams competed in the league – the top seventeen teams from the previous season and the three teams promoted from the Championship. The promoted teams were Leeds United, West Bromwich Albion and Fulham, after respective top flight absences of sixteen, two and one year(s). They replaced Bournemouth, Watford (both teams relegated after five years in the top flight), and Norwich City (relegated after a year back in the top flight).

Stadiums and locations 

Note: Table lists in alphabetical order.

Personnel and kits

Managerial changes

League table

Results

Season statistics

Scoring

Top scorers

Hat-tricks 

Notes
4 Player scored 4 goals(H) – Home team(A) – Away team

Clean sheets

Discipline

Player 

 Most yellow cards: 12
 John McGinn (Aston Villa)

 Most red cards: 2
 Lewis Dunk (Brighton & Hove Albion)

Club 

 Most yellow cards: 73
Sheffield United

 Most red cards: 6
Brighton & Hove Albion

Awards

Monthly awards

Annual awards

References

External links 

 Official website 

 
Premier League seasons
England
1